Rocket Man: The Definitive Hits (retitled Rocket Man: Number Ones for its USA and Canada release, and Just Like Belgium: The Definitive Hits for its Belgian release) is a compilation album by English musician Elton John featuring 13 number one songs and a number of bonus tracks and live renditions. Worldwide there have been released 17 different versions of the album, including a CD/DVD combo. All versions include the title track, "Rocket Man (I Think It's Going to Be a Long, Long Time)".

The album was released on 26 March 2007 to commemorate Elton John's 60th birthday on
25 March. The album was certified platinum in the UK for shipping 300,000 units in February 2010. In the US the album debuted on the Billboard 200 at number 9 and was certified gold for sales of 500,000 copies in October 2008 and platinum for 1,000,000 copies in November 2014. This was then followed by a double platinum and triple platinum certification in April 2016 and August 2017, respectively.

Track listings

Canon international edition
The international version includes, among others, the UK, Hungary, Italy, Poland, and Portugal.

The UK Special Edition (which included a DVD) omitted "Crocodile Rock" and "Sacrifice" and instead included "The Bitch Is Back" and "Can You Feel the Love Tonight?".

US/Canada edition

Country specific editions

Australian/New Zealand version
 "Bennie and the Jets"
 "Philadelphia Freedom"
 "Daniel"
 "Rocket Man (I Think It's Going to Be a Long, Long Time)"
 "I Guess That's Why They Call It the Blues"
 "Tiny Dancer"
 "Don't Let the Sun Go Down on Me"
 "Don't Go Breaking My Heart" (featuring Kiki Dee) (Live at Madison Square Garden, New York City, New York, US in October 2000)
 "Candle in the Wind"
 "Crocodile Rock"
 "I'm Still Standing"
 "Saturday Night's Alright (For Fighting)"
 "Your Song"
 "Sorry Seems to Be the Hardest Word"
 "Sacrifice"
 "Goodbye Yellow Brick Road"
 "Tinderbox"
 "Blue Eyes"

2CD Australian Tour Edition 2011
Disc 1
  Tiny Dancer
  Your Song
  Bennie and the Jets
  Don't Go Breaking My Heart
  Candle in the Wind
  Rocket Man (I Think It's Going To Be A Long, Long Time)
Daniel
  Crocodile Rock
  I Guess That's Why They Call It The Blues
  I'm Still Standing
  Something About The Way You Look Tonight
  Circle of Life
  Can You Feel The Love Tonight
Sacrifice
Goodbye Yellow Brick Road
  Don't Let The Sun Go Down on Me
  Nikita

Disc 2
  Sorry Seems To Be The Hardest Word
  Empty Garden (Hey Hey Johnny)
  Philadelphia Freedom
  Lucy in the Sky with Diamonds
  Someone Saved My Life Tonight
  Saturday Night's Alright (For Fighting)
  Levon
  The One
  Healing Hands
  Club at the End of the Street
  Mona Lisas And Mad Hatters
Blue Eyes
  Teacher I Need You
  Country Comfort
  Sad Songs (Say So Much)
  The Last Song

Austrian version
 Your Song
 Rocket Man (I Think It's Going to Be a Long, Long Time)
 Crocodile Rock
Daniel
Goodbye Yellow Brick Road
 Candle in the Wind
 Don't Let the Sun Go Down on Me
 Don't Go Breaking My Heart
 Sorry Seems to Be the Hardest Word
 Circle of Life
 Blue Eyes
 I'm Still Standing
 I Guess That's Why They Call It the Blues
 Sad Songs (Say So Much)
 Nikita
 I Don't Wanna Go on with You Like That
 Can You Feel the Love Tonight
 Tinderbox

Belgian version
 "Just Like Belgium"
 "Candle in the Wind"
 "Blue Eyes"
 "I Guess That's Why They Call It the Blues"
 "I'm Still Standing"
 "Crocodile Rock"
 "Don't Go Breaking My Heart"
 "Your Song"
 "Nikita"
 "Sacrifice"
 "Daniel"
 "Sorry Seems to Be the Hardest Word"
 "Don't Let the Sun Go Down on Me"
 "Rocket Man (I Think It's Going to Be a Long, Long Time)"
 "Song for Guy"
 "Circle of Life"
 "Can You Feel the Love Tonight"
 "Tinderbox"

Brazilian version
 "Bennie and the Jets"
 "Philadelphia Freedom"
 "Daniel"
 "Rocket Man (I Think It's Going to Be a Long, Long Time)"
 "I Guess That's Why They Call It the Blues"
 "Tiny Dancer"
 "Don't Let the Sun Go Down on Me"
 "I Want Love"
 "Candle in the Wind"
 "Crocodile Rock"
 "Your Song"
 "Sorry Seems to Be the Hardest Word"
 "Sacrifice"
 "Goodbye Yellow Brick Road"
 "Tinderbox"
 "Skyline Pigeon [Piano Version]"
 "Don't Go Breaking My Heart"
 "Sad Songs (Say So Much)"

Chinese version
 "Bennie and the Jets" – 5:22
 "Philadelphia Freedom" – 4:59
 "Daniel" – 3:53
 "Rocket Man (I Think It's Going to Be a Long, Long Time)" – 4:41
 "I Guess That's Why They Call it the Blues" – 4:41
 "Don't Let the Sun Go Down on Me" – 5:36
 "I Want Love" – 4:35
 "Candle in the Wind" – 3:48
 "Crocodile Rock" – 3:54
 "I'm Still Standing" – 3:01
 "Your Song" – 4:00
 "Sorry Seems to Be the Hardest Word" – 3:47
 "Sacrifice" – 5:04
 "Goodbye Yellow Brick Road" – 3:13
 "Can You Feel the Love Tonight" – 4:01
 "Are You Ready for Love" – 3:31

Danish version
 "I'm Still Standing" – 3:01
 "Goodbye Yellow Brick Road" – 3:14
 "Sad Songs (Say So Much)" – 4:08
 "Rocket Man (I Think It's Going to Be a Long, Long Time)" – 4:42
 "Don't Go Breaking My Heart" (Live at Madison Square Garden, New York City, New York, US, October 2000) – 4:33
 "Can You Feel the Love Tonight" – 3:59
 "Candle in the Wind" - 3:50
 "Nikita" - 5:43
 "Sorry Seems to Be the Hardest Word" – 3:49
 "Don't Let the Sun Go Down on Me" – 5:37
 "Blue Eyes" – 3:26
 "Your Song" – 4:02
 "Sacrifice" – 5:03
 "Daniel" - 3:54
 "Something About the Way You Look Tonight" – 3:59
 "Crocodile Rock" – 3:54
 "Tinderbox" – 4:22
 "I Guess That's Why They Call It the Blues" – 4:41

Dutch version
 "Your Song"
 "Border Song"
 "Rocket Man (I Think It's Going to Be a Long, Long Time)"
 "Daniel"
 "Goodbye Yellow Brick Road"
 "Candle in the Wind"
 "Don't Let the Sun Go Down on Me"
 "Sorry Seems to Be the Hardest Word"
 "Song for Guy"
 "I Guess That's Why They Call It the Blues"
 "Blue Eyes"
 "Sad Songs (Say So Much)"
 "Nikita"
 "Cry to Heaven"
 "Sacrifice"
 "Circle of Life"
 "Can You Feel the Love Tonight?"
 "Tinderbox"

Finnish version
 "Bennie and the Jets" – 5:22
 "Philadelphia Freedom" – 4:59
 "Daniel" – 3:53
 "Rocket Man (I Think It's Going to Be a Long, Long Time)" – 4:41
 "I Guess That's Why They Call it the Blues" – 4:41
 "Tiny Dancer" – 6:15
 "Don't Let the Sun Go Down on Me" (with George Michael) – 5:49
 "I Want Love" – 4:35
 "Candle in the Wind" – 3:48
 "The Bitch Is Back" – 3:42
 "I'm Still Standing" – 3:01
 "Saturday Night's Alright for Fighting" – 4:11
 "Your Song" – 4:00
 "Sorry Seems to Be the Hardest Word" (with Blue) (Radio edit) – 3:30
 "Can You Feel the Love Tonight" – 3:59
 "Goodbye Yellow Brick Road" – 3:13
 "Tinderbox" – 4:24

French version
 "Don't Go Breaking My Heart" (with Kiki Dee) – 4:35
 "Nikita" – 5:43
 "Sorry Seems to Be the Hardest Word" – 3:49
 "Sacrifice" – 5:04
 "Can You Feel the Love Tonight" – 3:59
 "Crocodile Rock" – 3:54
 "Your Song" – 4:02
 "Don't Let the Sun Go Down on Me" – 5:37
 "Candle in the Wind" – 3:50
 "Bennie and the Jets" – 5:24
 "I'm Still Standing" – 3:01
 "Someone Saved My Life Tonight" - 6:45
 "Rocket Man (I Think It's Going to Be a Long, Long Time)" – 4:42
 "Daniel" – 3:54
 "Tiny Dancer" – 6:17
 "Goodbye Yellow Brick Road" – 3:14
 "Tinderbox" – 4:22

German/Swiss version
 "Crocodile Rock"
 "Daniel"
 "Rocket Man (I Think It's Going to Be a Long, Long Time)"
 "I Guess That's Why They Call It the Blues"
 "Blue Eyes"
 "Don't Let the Sun Go Down on Me"
 "Sacrifice/Pinball Wizard" (Live in Verona, Italy, 1989)
 "Candle in the Wind"
 "Sad Songs (Say So Much)"
 "I'm Still Standing"
 "Saturday Night's Alright for Fighting"
 "Your Song"
 "Sorry Seems to Be the Hardest Word"
 "Can You Feel the Love Tonight"
 "Nikita"
 "Don't Go Breaking My Heart" (with Kiki Dee)
 "Goodbye Yellow Brick Road"
 "Tinderbox"

Japanese version
 "Your Song"
 "Candle in the Wind"
 "Goodbye Yellow Brick Road"
 "It's Me That You Need"
 "Friends"
 "Daniel"
 "Saturday Night's Alright (For Fighting)"
 "Crocodile Rock"
 "Rocket Man (I Think It's Going to Be a Long Long Time)"
 "I Guess That's Why They Call It the Blues"
 "Tiny Dancer"
 "Don't Let the Sun Go Down on Me"
 "Lucy in the Sky with Diamonds"
 "Island Girl"
 "Can You Feel the Love Tonight"
 "Empty Garden (Hey Hey Johnny)"
 "I'm Still Standing"
 "Sad Songs (Say So Much)"

Malaysian version
 "Bennie and the Jets"
 "Philadelphia Freedom"
 "Daniel"
 "Rocket Man (I Think It's Going to Be a Long, Long Time)"
 "I Guess That's Why They Call It the Blues"
 "Tiny Dancer"
 "Don't Let the Sun Go Down on Me"
 "I Want Love"
 "Candle in the Wind"
 "The Bitch Is Back"
 "I'm Still Standing"
 "Saturday Night's Alright (For Fighting)"
 "Your Song"
 "Sorry Seems to Be the Hardest Word"
 "Can You Feel the Love Tonight?"
 "Goodbye Yellow Brick Road"
 "Tinderbox"
 "Are You Ready For Love"

Norwegian version
 "Your Song" – 4:02
 "Goodbye Yellow Brick Road" – 3:14
 "Sorry Seems to Be the Hardest Word" – 3:49
 "Can You Feel the Love Tonight" – 3:59
 "Candle in the Wind" – 3:50
 "Don't Let the Sun Go Down on Me" – 5:37
 "Daniel" – 3:54
 "Something About the Way You Look Tonight" – 3:59
 "I'm Still Standing" – 3:01
 "Sacrifice/Pinball Wizard" (Live in Verona, Italy, 1989) – 3:38
 "Nikita" – 5:43
 "Rocket Man (I Think It's Going to Be a Long, Long Time)" – 4:42
 "Don't Go Breaking My Heart" – 4:33
 "I Guess That's Why They Call It the Blues" – 4:41
 "Circle of Life" – 4:50
 "Crocodile Rock" – 3:54
 "Blue Eyes" – 3:26
 "Tinderbox" – 4:22

South African version
 "Saturday Night's Alright for Fighting"
 "Bennie and the Jets"
 "Sacrifice/Pinball Wizard" (Live in Verona, Italy, 1989)
 "Candle in the Wind"
 "Nikita"
 "I Want Love"
 "Can You Feel the Love Tonight"
 "Daniel"
 "Little Jeannie"
 "I Guess That's Why They Call It the Blues"
 "Rocket Man (I Think It's Going to Be a Long, Long Time)"
 "Don't Let the Sun Go Down on Me"
 "Goodbye Yellow Brick Road"
 "I'm Still Standing"
 "Sorry Seems to Be the Hardest Word"
 "Blue Eyes"
 "Your Song"
 "Tinderbox"

Spanish version
 "Bennie and the Jets"
 "Philadelphia Freedom"
 "Daniel"
 "Rocket Man (I Think It's Going to Be a Long, Long Time)"
 "I Guess That's Why They Call It the Blues"
 "Tiny Dancer"
 "Don't Let the Sun Go Down on Me"
 "I Want Love"
 "Candle in the Wind"
 "Crocodile Rock"
 "I'm Still Standing"
 "Saturday Night's Alright for Fighting"
 "Your Song"
 "Sorry Seems to Be the Hardest Word"
 "Sacrifice/Pinball Wizard" (Live in Verona, Italy, 1989)
 "Goodbye Yellow Brick Road"
 "Tinderbox"

iTunes Deluxe album
Disc one
 "Bennie and the Jets" - 5:24
 "Philadelphia Freedom" - 5:21
 "Daniel" - 3:55
 "Rocket Man (I Think It's Going to Be a Long, Long Time)" - 4:43
 "I Guess That's Why They Call It the Blues" - 4:43
 "Tiny Dancer" - 6:17
 "Don't Let the Sun Go Down on Me" - 5:37
 "I Want Love" - 4:35
 "Candle in the Wind" - 3:51
 "Crocodile Rock" - 3:57
 "I'm Still Standing" - 3:01
 "Saturday Night's Alright (For Fighting)" - 4:53
 "Your Song" - 4:00
 "Sorry Seems to Be the Hardest Word" - 3:48

Disc two
 "Sacrifice" - 5:03
 "Goodbye Yellow Brick Road" - 3:14
 "Tinderbox" - 4:27
 "Are You Ready for Love" ('79 radio edit) - 3:30
 "Don't Go Breaking My Heart" (with Kiki Dee) - 4:35
 "Nikita" - 5:44
 "Border Song" - 3:21
 "Blue Eyes" - 3:25
 "Sad Songs (Say So Much)" - 4:09
 "Cry to Heaven" - 4:16
 "Circle of Life" - 4:50
 "Just Like Belgium" - 4:10
 "Skyline Pigeon" (Piano version) - 3:52
 "Something About the Way You Look Tonight" - 3:59

DVD
Red Piano Show (Live)
 "Bennie and the Jets"
 "Rocket Man (I Think It's Going to Be a Long, Long Time)"
 "Candle in the Wind"
 "Saturday Night's Alright (For Fighting)" (not included on the Chinese edition due to censorship restrictions)
 "Your Song"

Bonus videos
 "Your Song"
 "I Guess That's Why They Call It the Blues"
 "I'm Still Standing"
 "I Want Love"
 "Tinderbox"

Charts

Weekly charts

Year-end charts

Decade-end charts

Certifications

References

External links

2007 greatest hits albums
Albums produced by Gus Dudgeon
Albums produced by Chris Thomas (record producer)
2007 video albums
Live video albums
Music video compilation albums
Elton John compilation albums
2007 live albums
Mercury Records video albums
Mercury Records compilation albums
Mercury Records live albums
Compilation albums of number-one songs